Saw Hnaung (also known as Kodawgyi) was the Chief queen consort of kings Saw Yun and Tarabya I of Sagaing. She was the mother of three kings of Sagaing: Kyaswa, Nawrahta Minye and Tarabya II, and the maternal grandmother of King Thado Minbya, the founder of Ava. She was also a paternal aunt of King Swa Saw Ke of Ava.

Ancestry
The following is her ancestry as reported by the Hmannan Yazawin chronicle. She was a daughter of King Kyawswa of Pagan and Queen Saw Soe.

References

Bibliography
 
 

Pagan dynasty
Queens consort of Sagaing
14th-century Burmese women
13th-century Burmese women